(: ,) is a nearly-obsolete Japanese  (Japanese phonetic characters, each of which represents one mora). It is presumed that  represented , and that  and  represented distinct pronunciations before merging to  some time between the Kamakura and Taishō periods. It is now rare in everyday usage; in onomatopoeia and foreign words, the  form  (U-[small-i]) is preferred.

The  still sees some modern-day usage, however. The name of the comedy duo Yoiko is written , a character in the video game series Touhou Project has the name  (Tewi) and the first opening theme to the Future Diary anime series is titled  (Kuusou Mesorogiwi). It is far more common for /vi/ to be represented by the combination .

History

Nara period (710 – 794 AD)
During the Nara period, ヰ was pronounced as [wi] and イ  as [i].  In the Man'yōgana, there were characters to represent ヰ (e.g. 井, 位, 爲, 猪, 謂, 藍) and イ (e.g. 已, 五, 以, 伊, 怡, 射, 移, 異); no characters for one could be used to pronounce the other.  The labial glides ク [kʷi] and グ [gʷi] also existed (though in those days small script kana were not used for glides), and were distinct from キ [ki] and ギ [gi].

Heian Period (794 – 1184 AD)
During the Heian period, ゐ and い were still recognized as separately pronounced characters.  In the mid-to-late 11th century, the Iroha song was developed, and い, え, and お (i, e, and o) were differentiated from ゐ, ゑ, and を (wi, we, and wo).  In the Gojūon ordering (developed around 1075 by the scholar Hirotomo, based on the Siddhaṃ script), there were no sounds for “yi”, “ye”, “wu”, or “wo”.  Although the distinction had been lost between オ (o) and ヲ (wo) 
as well as 𛀀 (e) and エ (ye), there was still a distinction between  ア/ワ (a/wa), イ/ヰ (i/wi), and 𛀀/ヱ (e/we).

In Ki no Tsurayuki's literary work, the Tosa Nikki (originally written in 935, transcribed in 1236), the phrase “海賊報いせむ” (kaizoku mukui semu) is written as “かいぞくむくゐせむ” (kaizoku mukuwi semu), with ゐ where い should be.  In this way, examples of confusion between ゐ and い were emerging, little by little; however, during the Heian period these confusions were few and far between.

Since the Nara period, /h/ began to be pronounced as [w] in word-medial position; by the beginning of the 11th century, this phenomenon, called the "Ha-line shift", had become more widespread.  In word-medial or word-final position, ひ [ɸi] would be pronounced [wi], therefore becoming the same as ゐ.  Because of this, the use of ひ and ゐ also became confused.

At the end of the 12th century, the literary work “Shinkyō Shiki Chū” (which contained katakana, from the last years of the Insei period) attests examples of ゐ and い losing their distinction, such as “率て” (wite) being written “イテ” (ite).

Furthermore, in Heian period literature, special kanji readings such as “クヰヤウ” [kʷʲau] and “ヰヤウ” [wʲau] were used, but were not well established.

Kamakura Period (1185–1333 AD)
By the Kamakura period, the confusion between ゐ and い had become even more widespread, and by the 13th century, ゐ and い were unified.  By changing from [wi] to [i], ゐ had merged into い.  Also, kanji that were represented by クヰ and グヰ had become pronounced [ki] and [gi] respectively, merging them with キ and ギ.

Due to the Ha-line shift as well as the merging of a number of syllables, soon there were many kana pronounced the same way, and kana orthography was in chaos.  Fujiwara no Teika (1162–1241), in the “Unpleasant Characters” (嫌文字事) section of Gekanshū (a poetry volume), established rules for about 60 words containing を/お, え/へ/ゑ, and い/ひ/ゐ, based on a number of writings from the mid-11th to 12th century.  However, the books that Teika had referenced already contained a number of confusions, with ひ becoming ゐ, such as 遂 (formerly “つひ” tsuhi) being represented as “つゐ” (tsuwi) and 宵 (formerly “よひ” yohi) being represented as “よゐ” (yowi); い becoming either ひ or ゐ, such as 老い (historically “おい” oi) being represented as “おゐ” (owi) or “おひ” (ohi); and various other spellings differing from their original pronunciation.  Teika's syllabary particularly drew from poetry such as waka and renga, but a number of examples of confusion between い, ゐ, and word-medial/final ひ were also frequently pulled from other sources.

Muromachi Period (1333–1573 AD)

In the Nanboku-chō period, the scholar Gyōa published the Kanamojizukai (Kana Character Syllabary, completed in 1363), drastically augmenting the lexicon by over 1000 words.  Though the Kanamojizukai was generally as widely accepted as Teika's syllabary, in practice there were a number of kana pronunciations that did not conform to it.

In Christian rōmaji documents from the 16th century (the later part of the Muromachi period), ゐ and い were written with either “i”, “j”, or “y”, but the pronunciation was understood to be [i] in any case.

Stroke order

The Hiragana ゐ is made with one stroke. It resembles the second stroke of the Hiragana ぬ, with an additional short horizontal line at the start.

The Katakana ヰ is made with four strokes:
 A horizontal line.
 A vertical line.
 A horizontal line.
 A vertical line.

Other communicative representations

 Full Braille representation

 Computer encodings

See also
U (kana)
I (kana)

References

External links

Specific kana